Things We Lost in the Fire: Stories (Spanish: Las cosas que perdimos en el fuego) is a short story collection by Mariana Enriquez. Originally published in Spanish, it was translated into English by Megan McDowell in 2017.

"The Intoxicated Years" was published in Granta. "Spiderweb" appeared in The New Yorker.

Contents

Literary significance and reception 

Reviews of the collection highlighted Enriquez's dark and haunting style. A review in The Guardian called the collection "gruesome, violent, upsetting – and bright with brilliance." Jennifer Szalai, writing in The New York Times, wrote "[Enriquez] is after a truth more profound, and more disturbing, than whatever the strict dictates of realism will allow."

In a review in Vanity Fair, Sloane Crosley was impressed by Enriquez's skill at using supernatural stories to explore Argentina's political turmoil: "In her hands, the country’s inequality, beauty, and corruption tangle together to become a manifestation of our own darkest thoughts and fears."

References 

2016 short story collections
Spanish short story collections
Argentine short story collections
Horror short story collections
Editorial Anagrama books